Frank Fletcher Hamilton (3 April 1921 – 1 February 2008) was a Progressive Conservative member for Swift Current—Maple Creek of the House of Commons between 1972 and 1984.

Early life 
Hamilton attended school in Ford County, Saskatchewan, then secondary school at Mazenod, then the University of Saskatchewan. He served in the Royal Canadian Air Force from 1940 to 1951.

Political career 
He began his venture into politics in 1945 by representing the Progressive Conservative in the 1945 Canadian federal election and the 1953 Canadian federal election. He was defeated both times. Both Wood Mountain and Assiniboia (respectively) are historical federal electoral districts of Canada.

Hamilton was elected through 4 separate successful elections (1972–1984). He represented the federal riding of Swift Current—Maple Creek, Saskatchewan.

The 29th Canadian Parliament was in session from 4 January 1973 until 9 May 1974. The 30th Canadian Parliament was in session from 30 September 1974 until 26 March 1979. The 31st Canadian Parliament was a briefly lived parliament in session from 9 October until 14 December 1979 under the leadership of a Progressive Conservative minority and Prime Minister Joe Clark. The 32nd Canadian Parliament was in session from 14 April 1980 until 9 July 1984 and was controlled by a Liberal Party majority, led first by Prime Minister Pierre Trudeau and the 22nd Canadian Ministry, and then by Prime Minister John Turner.

Electoral history

References 

1921 births
2008 deaths
Members of the House of Commons of Canada from Saskatchewan
Progressive Conservative Party of Canada MPs
Royal Canadian Air Force personnel
University of Saskatchewan alumni